John Edmund Mulaney (born August 26, 1982) is an American stand-up comedian, actor, writer, and producer. Born and raised in Chicago, Illinois, Mulaney first rose to prominence for his work as a writer for the NBC sketch comedy series Saturday Night Live from 2008 to 2013, where he contributed to numerous sketches and characters, mainly Stefon, a recurring character that he and Bill Hader co-created. Since his departure from SNL, he has returned to host numerous times.

Mulaney is also known for his work as a stand-up comedian, with stand-up specials The Top Part (2009), New in Town (2012), The Comeback Kid (2015), and Kid Gorgeous (2018), for which he won the Primetime Emmy Award for Outstanding Writing for a Variety Special. Mulaney is also known for his Netflix children's musical comedy special John Mulaney & the Sack Lunch Bunch (2019).

He was the creator and star of the short-lived semi-autobiographical Fox sitcom Mulaney (2014–2015). Mulaney is known for his performance as George St. Geegland in a comedic duo with Nick Kroll. They appeared on television and on Broadway in a show entitled Oh, Hello on Broadway (2016). Mulaney serves as a co-executive producer, writer, and occasional actor in the IFC mockumentary series Documentary Now! (2015–present). He has also voiced  Andrew Glouberman in the Netflix original animated show Big Mouth. Mulaney made his film debut in 2018, voicing Peter Porker / Spider-Ham in the animated feature film Spider-Man: Into the Spider-Verse.

Early life
Mulaney was born on August 26, 1982, in Chicago, Illinois, to Ellen Mulaney ( Stanton), a professor at Northwestern University Pritzker School of Law, and Charles "Chip" Mulaney Jr., an attorney and partner at Skadden Arps. His parents are both of Irish Catholic heritage. Mulaney's maternal great-grandparents were George J. Bates, a Republican mayor of Salem, Massachusetts who also served as a congressman from that state, and Nora Jennings, who moved to the U.S. from Ballyhaunis, County Mayo. His maternal great-uncle is William H. Bates, who also served as a U.S. congressman. Coincidentally, Mulaney's maternal grandmother, Carolyn Stanton, and Hilary Meyers—mother of Mulaney's future Saturday Night Live coworker Seth Meyers—performed together in a hospital benefit show in Marblehead, Massachusetts, called Pills A-Poppin directed by Tommy Tune, then 19.

Mulaney's parents attended Georgetown University and Yale Law School. They were at Georgetown and Yale at the same time as future president Bill Clinton (Mulaney claims to have met Clinton in 1992). Growing up, Mulaney was an altar boy. He is the third of five children. He has an elder sister, an elder brother, a younger sister, and a younger brother who died at birth. His confirmation name is Martin, after St. Martin de Porres, to honor his late brother Peter Martin, who died in infancy when Mulaney was four.

From watching the lifestyle of the character Ricky Ricardo on the program I Love Lucy, Mulaney knew he wanted to go into show business at age five. At age seven, he was a member of a Chicago-based children’s sketch group called “The Rugrats”. Because of this, Mulaney had an opportunity to audition for the role of Kevin in the film Home Alone, but his parents declined. For junior high, he attended St. Clement School where, in lieu of doing reports he and his best friend, John O'Brien, would offer to perform what they had learned in the format of a skit. At 14, he played Wally Webb in a production of Our Town. Mulaney also frequented the Museum of Broadcast Communications, where he watched archived episodes of shows such as I Love Lucy or The Tonight Show Starring Johnny Carson. He attended St. Ignatius College Prep where he graduated in 2000. Mulaney then enrolled at his parents' alma mater, Georgetown University, where he majored in English and minored in theology. He joined the school's improv group, and met Nick Kroll and Mike Birbiglia. He later joined Birbiglia on his stand-up tour, which Mulaney cited as helping him overcome his stage fright.

Career
After graduating from Georgetown in 2004, Mulaney moved to New York City with ambitions of a career in comedy, and was hired as an office assistant at Comedy Central. After a year, he pitched the idea for a parody of the I Love the '80s called I Love the '30s, which he developed along with fellow comedian Nick Kroll. Mulaney was working at the network when Dave Chappelle abruptly left. Initially, the network had planned to fly Mulaney out to Los Angeles in order to secure the tapes for season three of Chappelle's eponymous show; however, feeling it was a "hindrance to being a comedian", he instead quit and started working freelance.

Comedy influences
When asked about his comedy influences, he said that he "always loved stand-up albums ... growing up in the '90s, I would sit on the floor with my Discman and listen to comedy albums that I bought". Mulaney has been a long time collector of stand up albums. He has mentioned loving Chris Rock's Bring the Pain (1996) and Bigger & Blacker (1999), as well as Woody Allen's Comedian (1965), Nichols and May's Mike Nichols & Elaine May Examine Doctors (1961), and Albert Brooks' Comedy Minus One (1973). He has also mentioned listening to a lot of Jerry Seinfeld, Dave Chappelle, George Carlin, Richard Pryor, Conan O'Brien and Bob Newhart.

Saturday Night Live

After being discovered while performing on Late Night with Conan O'Brien, Mulaney was asked to audition for Saturday Night Live in August 2008, along with Kroll, Donald Glover, Ellie Kemper, T.J. Miller and Bobby Moynihan. Unusual for an SNL audition, Mulaney did not prepare any impressions, instead performing standup with "charactery bits in them". He went in with low expectations, although he thought it'd be a "cool story". Mulaney won a spot on the writing team, where he remained for four seasons. He also occasionally appeared on the show's Weekend Update segment. He and SNL actor Bill Hader co-created the recurring SNL character Stefon. Mulaney was nominated for the Primetime Emmy Award for Outstanding Writing for a Variety Series with the SNL writing staff from 2009 to 2012. Mulaney won a Primetime Emmy Award for Outstanding Original Music and Lyrics at the 2011 Emmys with Justin Timberlake, Seth Meyers and Katreese Barnes. 

Mulaney returned to host Saturday Night Live five times: on April 14, 2018; March 2, 2019; February 29, 2020; October 31, 2020; and February 26, 2022, making him the fourth SNL writer (after Conan O'Brien, Louis C.K., and Larry David) to host SNL. During his time as a host he became known for his opening monologues and his elaborate musical number sketches including "Diner Lobster", "Bodega Musical", "Subway Churro", "Airport Sushi", and "New York Musical". Mulaney joined Saturday Night Lives Five Timer's Club on February 26, 2022. Candice Bergen, Tina Fey, Elliott Gould, Steve Martin, and Conan O'Brien welcomed Mulaney into the club in an on-air sketch.

 Work after Saturday Night Live 
Following his tenure at Saturday Night Live, Mulaney contributed writing to other TV projects, including Maya & Marty; Documentary Now!; Oh, Hello on Broadway; and the Comedy Central Roast of James Franco. He also acted in supporting roles on television shows such as Crashing, Portlandia, and Difficult People. Mulaney currently provides the voice of a lead character on the animated Netflix series Big Mouth alongside his writing partner Nick Kroll, who co-created the show. Together with Nick Kroll, Mulaney also co-hosted the Independent Spirit Awards ceremonies in 2017 and 2018. In 2018, Mulaney provided the voice of Spider-Ham in the Academy Award-winning animated film Spider-Man: Into the Spider-Verse. He also appeared in a Netflix and YouTube collaboration series hosted by Tan France, Dressing Funny, in June 2019. In November 2020, Late Night with Seth Meyers producer Mike Shoemaker announced that Mulaney had joined the show as a staff writer. Mulaney also returned to voice Spider-Ham in the mobile game Marvel Contest of Champions, and the promotional animated short film Back on the Air.

Stand-up comedy
In addition to his work on SNL, Mulaney has worked for 18 years as a stand-up comedian. He has been a headliner since 2008. He has performed on Live at Gotham, Conan, Jimmy Kimmel Live, Late Night With Jimmy Fallon, Late Night With Conan O'Brien, and Comedy Central Presents. Mulaney also released a comedy album titled The Top Part in 2009 and a stand-up comedy special called New in Town in 2012. Both were produced with Comedy Central. He performed at the 2008 Bonnaroo Music Festival.

Mulaney's third comedy special, titled The Comeback Kid, was released on November 13, 2015, on Netflix. His second stand-up show, New in Town, which premiered on Comedy Central in 2012, is also on Netflix. The Comeback Kid received critical acclaim, with David Sims of The Atlantic calling it "a reminder of everything that makes Mulaney so singular: storytelling rich with well-observed details, delivered with the confidence of someone decades older than 33". In 2016, Mulaney received a nomination for the Primetime Emmy Award for Outstanding Writing for a Variety Special for The Comeback Kid, losing to Patton Oswalt's Talking for Clapping.

Mulaney's fourth stand-up comedy tour, Kid Gorgeous, kicked off its first leg in May 2017, concluding in July of that year. A second leg began in September 2017 in Colorado Springs, Colorado and concluded in April 2018 in Jacksonville, Florida. The tour featured seven shows at Radio City Music Hall in New York City in February 2018, one of which was filmed for another Netflix special. Kid Gorgeous was met with critical acclaim, with Steve Greene of IndieWire calling it "one of the year's best pieces of writing". David Sims of The Atlantic praised Mulaney's talents as a standup writing, "With Kid Gorgeous, Mulaney is proving he can endure in a field that even the most successful and talented comics can struggle to stay afloat in." At the 70th Primetime Emmy Awards, Mulaney received an Emmy for Outstanding Writing for a Variety Special for Kid Gorgeous.

In 2017, he was invited to appear alongside Steve Martin, Martin Short, Bill Murray, Jimmy Kimmel, and Norm MacDonald to honor David Letterman, who was accepting The Mark Twain Prize for American Humor at The Kennedy Center. When accepting the prize, Letterman stated, "John Mulaney, this is the future of comedy, ladies and gentlemen." That same year, Mulaney was also invited to appear to do standup at Jon Stewart's charity event Night of Too Many Stars (2017) on HBO, and Seth Rogen's charity event Hilarity for Charity (2018) on Netflix.

In January 2019, it was announced that Mulaney would be touring with Pete Davidson together in New York, New Jersey, Pennsylvania and Massachusetts for a limited series of comedy shows titled "Sundays with Pete & John". Mulaney and Davidson have become close, appearing together on The Tonight Show with Jimmy Fallon and Saturday Night Live.

In December 2020, Mulaney sought treatment for alcoholism and cocaine addiction, and prescription drug abuse in a 60-day program at a rehab facility in Pennsylvania. In May 2021, Mulaney returned to stand up comedy working out new material titled, John Mulaney: From Scratch. Mulaney performed for several sold out shows at City Winery in New York City before announcing a tour starting in Boston where he sold out 21 shows.

Mulaney's tour From Scratch is scheduled to run from March through June 2022 with 33 shows.

Mulaney honored Robin Williams posthomously in the Netflix special The Hall: Honoring the Greats of Stand-Up, which was filmed at the Hollywood Palladium as part of the Netflix is a Joke Fest in Los Angeles. Mulaney appeared in the special alongside Jon Stewart, Dave Chappelle, Pete Davidson, and Chelsea Handler. In May 2022, during his From Scratch tour, Mulaney invited Chappelle to open his show, which drew criticism due to jokes made by Chappelle that have been seen as transphobic.

Mulaney

In May 2013, NBC passed on picking up Mulaney's semi-autobiographical sitcom pilot, titled Mulaney. In June 2013, Fox ordered a new script while considering whether to order the production of several episodes. In October 2013, Fox announced that they picked up the show for a six-episode season order. Mulaney was the creator, producer, and writer of his eponymous series until its cancellation in May 2015. Mulaney is quoted as saying he "wanted to do the type of live-audience multi-camera sitcoms that I grew up on". The series received poor reviews, including playwright and The New York Times TV critic Neil Genzlinger's, who wrote "It rips off Seinfeld so aggressively that in Episode 2 it even makes fun of its own plagiarism. But one thing it forgot to borrow from Seinfeld was intelligence."

Documentary Now!

In 2015, Mulaney served as a writer for the IFC mockumentary series Documentary Now! (2015–present). The series was created by Fred Armisen, Bill Hader, and Seth Meyers. During the first season he served as consulting producer before moving as a co-executive producer. His first acting role on the show was in the episode Original Cast Album: Co-Op in Season 3. Mulaney also co-wrote the episode and the songs with Seth Meyers. In the episode Mulaney plays the fictional Simon Sayer, a character based on composer and lyricist Stephen Sondheim. The episode spoofs the landmark D.A. Pennebaker documentary Original Cast Album: Company (1970). The episode features a fictional ill-fated 1970 Broadway musical Co-op, with songs detailing the joys and pains of a New York City housing cooperative. The episode also featured performances from Renée Elise Goldsberry, Richard Kind, and Alex Brightman. The episode received widespread critical acclaim with Esquire magazine writing, "Original Cast Recording: Co-op" may be the best episode of the faux-documentary TV series yet".

George St. Geegland

Mulaney regularly performs as George St. Geegland, an elderly man from the Upper West Side of New York. St. Geegland and fellow New Yorker Gil Faizon (portrayed by Georgetown classmate and comedian Nick Kroll), host a prank show called Too Much Tuna in which guests are given sandwiches with too much tuna fish. Mulaney has toured the United States alongside Kroll in a show called Oh, Hello, with both in character as George St. Geegland and Gil Faizon, respectively. The show premiered on Broadway on September 23, 2016, and concluded its run on January 22, 2017. The Broadway production was filmed and released on Netflix on June 13, 2017. Steve Martin was the celebrity special guest, with a bonus clip showing Michael J. Fox as the guest. Matthew Broderick appeared as himself in a brief cameo towards the end of the special.

 Sack Lunch Bunch 

In December 2019, Mulaney released a children's musical comedy special titled John Mulaney & the Sack Lunch Bunch on Netflix. The special was inspired by Sesame Street, Mister Rogers' Neighborhood, The Electric Company, Free to Be... You and Me, and 3-2-1 Contact. The special features Mulaney, along with fifteen child actors and singers, aged 8 to 13. Celebrity cameos include Tony Award winner André De Shields, David Byrne, Richard Kind, Natasha Lyonne, Annaleigh Ashford, and Jake Gyllenhaal as "Mr. Music". The special has been universally praised, receiving a 96% fresh score on Rotten Tomatoes. Critic Alan Sepinwall of Rolling Stone Magazine, wrote "It is, like Galaxy Quest, The Princess Bride, or Jane the Virgin, one of those gems that manages to simultaneously parody a genre and be an excellent recreation of it." In 2020, Mulaney received two Primetime Emmy Award nominations for Outstanding Variety Special (Pre-Recorded) and Outstanding Writing for a Variety Special for his work on the special.

 Other appearances 
In 2020, Mulaney interviewed actor and playwright André Gregory for the Chicago Humanities Festival where they talked about Gregory's latest memoir, This Is Not My Memoir, as well as discussing his life and career.

Personal life
On July 5, 2014, Mulaney married multimedia artist Annamarie Tendler. Their wedding ceremony was performed by friend Dan Levy in Boiceville, New York. Their separation was announced in May 2021. The same month, it was reported that Mulaney had begun a relationship with actress Olivia Munn. Mulaney filed for divorce in July of that year, and the divorce was finalized in January 2022. 

In September 2021, Mulaney announced that he and Munn were expecting a child. Their son was born on November 24, 2021.

Mulaney has stated that he believes in God. In 2017 on WTF with Marc Maron, Mulaney explained his religious views more closely align with Jewish theology than the Catholic ideas of his upbringing.

Mulaney has spoken extensively about his love of basketball in his comedy and frequently attends NBA games. Mulaney is a fan of the Chicago Bulls and occasionally attends to Brooklyn Nets games when he is in New York.

He has been diagnosed with ADHD.

 Substance use and recovery 
Mulaney has discussed his struggles with drugs and drinking onstage. In a 2014 interview, he stated that he had been sober since September 22, 2005. In December 2020, he checked into a drug rehabilitation center in Pennsylvania for alcoholism, cocaine addiction, and prescription drug abuse. He moved into outpatient care in February 2021. In his first appearance on television in 2021, Mulaney explained that he had checked into a rehabilitation facility in September 2020, left the recovery program, hosted Saturday Night Live in October following his stint in rehab, and relapsed once again following the show. Seth Meyers, Fred Armisen, Bill Hader, Nick Kroll, Natasha Lyonne and other friends then staged an intervention for Mulaney preceding his December 2020 rehab stint.

 Political views 

In 2016, Mulaney appeared at an event honoring the Armed forces at Joint Base Andrews entitled, "A Celebration of Service" organized by the USO. Mulaney performed standup comedy alongside comedians Jon Stewart, Hasan Minhaj, Mike Birbiglia, Kristen Schaal, and David Letterman. Also in attendance were then President Barack Obama, Michelle Obama, Vice President Joe Biden, and Jill Biden.

While hosting Saturday Night Live on February 29, 2020, Mulaney noted that Julius Caesar was stabbed by the Senate for being a maniac, and joked, "That would be an interesting thing if we brought that back now!", in reference to Donald Trump. This joke led to him being investigated by the United States Secret Service. A Secret Service agent contacted NBC on March 2 to try and get in touch with Mulaney's lawyers, but ultimately did not contact him and recommended no action, closing the file on March 5.

In a 2019 Esquire magazine interview, Mulaney stated that he donated to the Bernie Sanders 2016 presidential campaign. On June 2, 2020, Mulaney was seen with his then-wife at a Black Lives Matter protest in Washington D.C.

In his opening monologue on Saturday Night Live the weekend before the 2020 United States presidential election, Mulaney described the election as an "elderly man contest" and commented, "Rest assured, no matter what happens, nothing much will change in the United States. The rich will continue to prosper while the poor languish. Families will be upended by mental illness and drug addiction. Jane Lynch will continue to book lots of projects." Mulaney's statement that "nothing much will change" caused some controversy among audiences. The Daily Beast criticized Mulaney, writing, "To tell the millions of people watching SNL three days before the election that there is essentially no difference between Donald Trump and Joe Biden can only be described as deeply irresponsible." The joke was described by some as "tone deaf", while others praised Mulaney's allusions to the issues of wealth inequality and drug addiction, and pointed out that Mulaney later urged viewers to vote. In a later appearance on Jimmy Kimmel Live, Mulaney reflected he "deserved the backlash" and said he "forgot to make the joke good".

In June 2021, Mulaney appeared alongside Alexandria Ocasio-Cortez as openers for a concert featuring the Strokes, which served as a fundraiser for New York City mayoral candidate Maya Wiley.

 Filmography 
Film

Television

 Specials 

 Theatre 

 Video games 

 Discography Standup specials The Top Part (Comedy Central Records, 2009)
 New in Town (Comedy Central Records, 2012)
 The Comeback Kid (Drag City, 2015)
 John Mulaney: Kid Gorgeous at Radio City (Drag City, 2018)Musical Original Cast Album: Co-Op (Lakeshore Records, 2019) 
 John Mulaney & the Sack Lunch Bunch (Drag City, 2019) Touring  John Mulaney: Kid Gorgeous (2017–2018)
 Sundays with Pete and John (2019)
 John Mulaney: From Scratch (2021–2023)

Awards and nominations

Mulaney has received numerous awards nominations and wins for his work in television. In 2009 Mulaney won a Peabody Award alongside the writers of Saturday Night Live for their satirical work on the 2008 United States presidential election. He has received many Primetime Emmy Award nominations for his work on Saturday Night Live and Documentary Now! He won his first Emmy Award in 2011 for co-writing the song "Justin Timberlake Monologue" with Seth Meyers and Justin Timberlake, which aired on Saturday Night Live. He won his second Emmy in 2018 for Outstanding Writing for a Variety Special for his standup special John Mulaney: Kid Gorgeous at Radio City.Primetime Emmy Awards'

References

External links
 

 
 

1982 births
21st-century American comedians
21st-century American male actors
21st-century American screenwriters
21st-century American male writers
American male comedians
American male television actors
American male television writers
American male voice actors
American people of Irish descent
American sketch comedians
American stand-up comedians
American television writers
Comedians from Illinois
Georgetown College (Georgetown University) alumni
Living people
Male actors from Chicago
Primetime Emmy Award winners
Screenwriters from Illinois
Shorty Award winners
St. Ignatius College Prep alumni
Writers from Chicago